Demons is a Star Trek: The Original Series novel written by J.M. Dillard.

Plot
A strange device found by a scientific expedition is taken to the planet Vulcan. It begins taking people over one by one, replacing them with malevolent power-hungry entities. The crew of the Enterprise, those not yet replaced, must contain this threat to Vulcan and defeat it.

Background
This story is continued in the Star Trek: The Next Generation novel Possession, also by J.M. Dillard, where it is revealed the device is one of many.

Reception

The book made the New York Times bestseller list in July 1986.

Robert Greenberger praised the novel for "some nice bits about Vulcan ritual and mind-control".

The character Anitra Lantry was described as a "Mary Sue" by Camille Bacon-Smith.

References

External links

Novels based on Star Trek: The Original Series
1986 American novels
American science fiction novels